The 1864 Indiana gubernatorial election was held on October 11, 1864. Incumbent Republican Oliver P. Morton defeated Democratic nominee Joseph E. McDonald with 53.72% of the vote.

General election

Candidates
Oliver P. Morton, Republican, incumbent
Joseph E. McDonald, Democratic, former Attorney General

Results

References

1864
Indiana
Gubernatorial